A History of Embryology is a 1934 book by Joseph Needham.

The book is based on lectures on Speculation, Observation, and Experiment. The same lectures were then compiled and released as a book published.  The works contain several sections dedicated to Spagyric.

References

Non-fiction books